Castelmarte is a comune (municipality) in the Province of Como in the Italian region Lombardy, located about  north of Milan and about  east of Como.

Castelmarte borders the following municipalities: Canzo, Caslino d'Erba, Erba, Ponte Lambro, Proserpio.

Demographic evolution

References

Cities and towns in Lombardy